The Takla Group is a group of basalt and andesite lava flows, pyroclastic rocks, volcanogenic sandstones and argillites in north-central British Columbia, Canada, covering more than  of the Stikinia terrane in a belt up to  wide and over  long.

See also
Volcanism of Canada
Volcanism of Western Canada

References

Volcanism of British Columbia
Triassic volcanism
Volcanic groups
Northern Interior of British Columbia